William Purinton Bomar Jr. (1919, Fort Worth-1991), known as Bill Bomar, was an American artist, and a member of the Fort Worth Circle.

Supposedly Bomar's interest in painting was stimulated at the age of seven by his having his portrait painted by Murray Bewley. Bomar was taught oil technique by Sallie Blythe Mummert, and watercolour by Joseph G. Bakos of Santa Fe. From 1940 to 1941 Bomar was at the Cranbrook Art Academy, Michigan. Since youth, Bomar had spent the summer months in New Mexico. He moved permanently to Ranchos de Taos from New York in 1972, and died in Ranchos de Taos in 1991.

Together with his cousin Reilly Nail, Bomar founded the Old Jail Art Center in Albany, Texas in 1980. The core of the museum's collection was formed from Nail's and Bomar's collections, with Asian art from the collections of their mothers. The museum has a strong holding of Fort Worth Circle art.

References

1919 births
1991 deaths
20th-century American painters
People from Fort Worth, Texas
Artists from New Mexico
Cranbrook Academy of Art alumni